Judianne Fotheringill (born July 21, 1944 in Chehalis, Washington) is an American pair skater. With brother Jerry Fotheringill, she is the 1963 and 1964 U.S. national champion. They represented the United States at the 1964 Winter Olympics where they placed 7th.

The Fotheringills were originally from Tacoma, Washington but later relocated to train in Colorado Springs, Colorado, where they represented the Broadmoor Skating Club. Judi attended Colorado College during the time she was competing.

Competitive highlights
(with Jerry Fotheringill)

References

 
  

American female pair skaters
Olympic figure skaters of the United States
Figure skaters at the 1964 Winter Olympics
1944 births
Living people
People from Chehalis, Washington
21st-century American women
20th-century American women